Chandradip Narke  is a Shiv Sena politician from Kolhapur district, Maharashtra. He is former Member of Legislative Assembly from Karvir Vidhan Sabha constituency of Kolhapur, Maharashtra, India as a member of Shiv Sena. He has been elected for 2 consecutive terms in the Maharashtra Legislative Assembly for 2009 & 2014.And got defeated in 2019.

Positions held
 2009: Elected to Maharashtra Legislative Assembly (1st term)
 2014: Re-Elected to Maharashtra Legislative Assembly (2nd term)

References

External links
 
 Kolhapur district public representatives

Living people
People from Kolhapur district
Maharashtra MLAs 2009–2014
Maharashtra MLAs 2014–2019
Shiv Sena politicians
1967 births
Place of birth missing (living people)
Marathi politicians